This is a list of butterflies of French Guiana. About 850 species are known from French Guiana.

Papilionidae

Papilioninae 

Battus belus (Cramer, [1777])
Battus lycidas (Cramer, [1777])
Battus polydamas (Linnaeus, 1758)
Eurytides callias (Rothschild & Jordan, 1906)
Eurytides dolicaon (Cramer, [1775])
Mimoides ariarathes (Esper, 1788)
Mimoides pausanias (Hewitson, 1852)
Papilio androgeus Cramer, [1775]
Papilio anchisiades Esper, 1788
Papilio chiansiades Westwood, 1872
Papilio garleppi Staudinger, 1892
Papilio menatius (Hübner, [1819])
Papilio neyi Niepelt, 1909
Papilio thoas Linnaeus, 1771
Papilio torquatus Cramer, [1777]
Parides aeneas (Linnaeus, 1758) (Parides aeneas lucasi)
Parides anchises (Linnaeus, 1758)
Parides chabrias (Hewitson, 1852) (Parides chabrias ygdrasilla)
Parides coelus (Boisduval, 1836)
Parides echemon (Hübner, [1813]) (Parides echemon ercheteles)
Parides lysander (Cramer, [1775])
Parides mithras (Grose-Smith, 1902)
Parides neophilus (Geyer, 1837)
Parides panthonus (Cramer, [1780]) (Parides panthonus barbotini)
Parides phosphorus (Bates, 1861)
Parides sesostris (Cramer, [1779])
Parides vertumnus (Cramer, [1779])
Protesilaus molops (Rothschild & Jordan, 1906)
Protesilaus protesilaus (Linnaeus, 1758)

Riodinidae 

Adelotypa penthea (Cramer, [1777])
Adelotypa wia Brévignon & Gallard, 1992
Alesa amesis (Cramer, 1777)
Alesa rothschildi (Seitz, [1917])
Alesa telephae (Boisduval, 1836)
Amarynthis meneria (Cramer, [1776])
Ancyluris aristodorus (Morisse, 1838)
Ancyluris aulestes (Cramer, 1777)
Ancyluris meliboeus (Fabricius, 1777)
Ancyluris tedea (Cramer, 1777)
Anteros aurigans Gallard & Brévignon, 1989
Archaeonympha drepana (Bates, 1868)
Archaeonympha urichi (Vane-Wright, 1994)
Argyrogrammana alstonii (Smart, 1979)
Argyrogrammana chicomendesi Gallard, 1995
Argyrogrammana denisi Gallard, 1995
Argyrogrammana glaucopis (Bates, 1868)
Argyrogrammana johannismarci Brévignon, 1995
Argyrogrammana nurtia (Stichel, 1911)
Argyrogrammana placibilis (Stichel, 1910)
Argyrogrammana physis (Stichel, 1911)
Argyrogrammana praestigiosa (Stichel, 1929)
Argyrogrammana occidentalis (Godman & Salvin, [1886])
Argyrogrammana rameli (Stichle, 1930)
Argyrogrammana sebastiani Brévignon, 1995
Argyrogrammana stilbe (Godart, [1824])
Argyrogrammana sublimis Brévignon & Gallard, 1995
Argyrogrammana talboti Brévignon & Gallard, 1998
Argyrogrammana trochilia (Westwood, 1851)
Argyrogrammana venilia (Bates, 1868)
Aricoris zachaeus (Fabricius, 1798)
Baeotis barce Hewitson, 1875
Baeotis capreolus Stichel, 1910
Baeotis euprepes (Bates, 1868)
Baeotis hisbon (Cramer, [1775])
Baeotis prima (Bates, 1868)
Callistium cleadas (Hewitson, [1866])
Calospila antonii Brévignon, 1995
Calospila apotheta (Bates, 1868)
Calospila emylius (Cramer, 1775)
Calospila fannia (Godman, 1903)
Calospila gallardi Brévignon, 1995
Calospila gyges (Stichel, 1911)
Calospila maeonoides (Godman, 1903)
Calospila rhodope (Hewitson, 1853)
Calospila satyroides (Lathy, 1932)
Calospila thara (Hewitson, [1858])
Calospila zeanger (Stoll, [1790])
Calydna cabira Hewitson, 1854
Calydna caieta Hewitson, 1854
Calydna stolata Brévignon, 1998
Calydna thersander (Stoll, [1780])
Calydna venusta Godman & Salvin, [1886]
Chalodeta chaonitis (Hewitson, [1866])
Chalodeta chitinosa Hall, 2002
Chamaelimnas briola Bates, 1868
Chorinea amazon (Saunders, 1859)
Chorinea batesii (Saunders, 1859)
Chorinea octauius (Fabricius, 1787)
Colaciticus johnstoni (Dannatt, 1904)
Comphotis irroratum (Godman, 1903)
Cremna actoris (Cramer, [1776])
Cremna alector (Geyer, 1837)
Dachetola pione (Bates, 1868)
Detritivora cleonus (Stoll, [1782])
Detritivora gallardi (Hall & Harvey, 2001)
Dysmathia costalis Bates, 1868
Dysmathia portia Bates, [1868]
Emesis lucinda (Cramer, [1775])
Esthemopsis crystallina Brévignon & Gallard, 1992
Eurybia cyclopia Stichel, 1910
Eurybia dardus (Fabricius, 1787)
Eurybia juturna C. & R. Felder, 1865
Euselasia arbas (Stoll, 1781)
Euselasia bilineata Lathy, 1926
Euselasia cafusa (Bates, 1868)
Euselasia cuprea Lathy, 1926
Euselasia euboea (Hewitson, [1853])
Euselasia euodias (Hewitson, 1856)
Euselasia euoras (Hewitson, [1855])
Euselasia euryone (Hewitson, 1856)
Euselasia eustola Stichel, 1919
Euselasia eutychus (Hewitson, 1856)
Euselasia fayneli Gallard, 2006
Euselasia gelanor (Stoll, 1780)
Euselasia ignitus Stichel, 1924
Euselasia inini Brévignon, 1996
Euselasia kartopus Stichel, 1919
Euselasia lisias (Cramer, [1777])
Euselasia manoa Brévignon, 1996
Euselasia midas (Fabricius, 1775)
Euselasia opalescens (Hewitson, [1855])
Euselasia orfita (Cramer, 1777)
Euselasia phedica (Boisduval, [1836])
Euselasia phelina (Druce, 1878)
Euselasia praecipua Stichel, 1924
Euselasia rubrocilia Lathy, 1926
Euselasia saulina Brévignon, 1996
Euselasia scotinosa Stichel, 1930
Euselasia teleclus (Stoll, 1787)
Euselasia urites (Hewitson, [1853])
Euselasia uzita (Hewitson, [1853])
Euselasia venezolana Seitz, 1913
Euselasia violetta (Bates, 1868)
Euselasia waponaka Brévignon, 1996
Euselasia zena (Hewitson, 1860)
Helicopis cupido (Linnaeus, 1758)
Helicopis endymiaena (Hübner, [1819])
Hermathena candidata Hewitson, 1874
Hyphilaria anthias (Hewitson, 1874)
Hyphilaria nicia Hübner, [1819]
Hyphilaria parthenis (Westwood, 1851)
Ithomeis aurantiaca Bates, 1862
Ithomiola floralis C. & R. Felder, [1865]
Juditha azan (Westwood, [1851])
Juditha dorilis (Bates, 1866)
Juditha odites (Cramer, [1775])
Lasaia agesilas (Latreille, 1809)
Lasaia lalannei Gallard, 2008
Lasaia oileus Godman, 1903
Lemonias egaensis (Butler, 1867)
Lemonias zygia Hübner, [1807]
Leucochimona icare (Hübner, [1819])
Leucochimona lagora (Herrich-Schäffer, [1853])
Livendula aminias (Hewitson, 1863)
Livendula balista (Hewitson, 1863)
Livendula jasonhalli (Brévignon & Gallard, 1999)
Livendula leucocyana (Geyer, 1837)
Melanis aegates (Hewitson, 1874)
Melanis electron (Fabricius, 1793)
Menander coruscans (Butler, 1867)
Menander hebrus (Cramer, [1775])
Menander menander (Stoll, [1780])
Menander thalassicus Brévignon & Gallard, 1992
Mesene bomilcar (Stoll, 1790)
Mesene epaphus (Stoll, 1780)
Mesene monostigma (Erichson, [1849])
Mesene nepticula Möschler, 1877
Mesene patawa Brévignon, 1995
Mesene phareus (Cramer, [1777])
Mesene silaris Godman & Salvin, 1878
Mesophthalma idotea Westwood, [1851]
Mesosemia ackeryi Brévignon, 1997
Mesosemia antaerice Hewitson, 1859
Mesosemia ephyne (Cramer, 1776)
Mesosemia epidius Hewitson, 1859
Mesosemia esmeralda Gallard & Brévignon, 1989
Mesosemia eumene (Cramer, 1776)
Mesosemia inconspicua Lathy, 1932
Mesosemia melaene Hewitson, 1859
Mesosemia menoetes Hewitson, 1859
Mesosemia metope Hewitson, 1859
Mesosemia minutula Gallard, 1996
Mesosemia naiadella Stichel, 1909
Mesosemia nympharena Stichel, 1909
Mesosemia orbona Godman, 1903
Mesosemia sifia (Boisduval, 1836)
Mesosemia teulem Brévignon, 1995
Metacharis lucius (Fabricius, 1793)
Monethe albertus C. & R. Felder, 1862
Mycastor nealces (Hewitson, 1871)
Napaea beltiana (Bates, 1867)
Napaea eucharila (Bates, 1867)
Napaea gynaecomorpha Hall, Harvey & Gallard, 2005
Napaea nepos (Fabricius, 1793)
Napaea orpheus (Westwood, 1851)
Napaea sylva (Möschler, 1877)
Notheme erota (Cramer, [1780])
Nymphidium acherois (Boisduval, 1836)
Nymphidium baeotia Hewitson, [1853]
Nymphidium cachrus (Fabricius, 1787)
Nymphidium callaghani Brévignon, 1999
Nymphidium caricae (Linnaeus, 1758)
Nymphidium colleti Gallard, 2008
Nymphidium guyanensis Gallard & Brévignon, 1989
Nymphidium hermieri Gallard, 2008
Nymphidium lisimon (Stoll, 1790)
Nymphidium manicorensis Callaghan, 1985
Nymphidium mantus (Cramer, 1775)
Nymphidium menalcus (Stoll, 1782)
Pachythone lateritia Bates, 1868
Panara phereclus (Linnaeus, 1758)
Panaropsis semiota (Bates, 1868)
Panaropsis thyatira (Hewitson, [1853])
Pandemos pasiphae (Cramer, [1775])
Perophthalma tullius (Fabricius, 1787)
Pheles atricolor (Butler, 1871)
Pheles heliconides Herrich-Schäffer, [1858]
Pirascca arbuscula (Möschler, 1883)
Pirascca interrupta (Lathy, 1932)
Pirascca sticheli (Lathy, 1932)
Pirascca tyriotes (Godman & Salvin, 1878)
Riodina lysippus (Linnaeus, 1758)
Rodinia calphurnia (Saunders, 1850)
Roeberella flocculus Brévignon & Gallard, 1993
Sarota acanthoides (Herrich-Schäffer, [1853])
Sarota chrysus (Stoll, [1782])
Sarota gamelia Godman & Salvin, [1886]
Sarota miranda Brévignon, 1998
Setabis epitus (Cramer, [1780])
Setabis lagus (Cramer, [1777])
Semomesia alyattes Zikán, 1952
Semomesia capanea (Cramer, 1779)
Semomesia cecilae Gallard, 1997
Semomesia nesti (Hewitson, 1858)
Stalachtis calliope (Linnaeus, 1758)
Stalachtis euterpe (Linnaeus, 1758)
Stalachtis phaedusa (Hübner, [1813])
Symmachia accusatrix Westwood, 1851
Symmachia basilissa (Bates, 1868)
Symmachia calligrapha Hewitson, 1867
Symmachia calliste Hewitson, 1867
Symmachia emeralda Hall & Harvey, 2002
Symmachia estellina Gallard, 2008
Symmachia falcistriga Stichel, 1910
Symmachia hippea Herrich-Schäffer, [1853]
Symmachia juratrix Westwood, 1851
Symmachia leena Hewitson, 1870
Symmachia leopardinum (C. & R. Felder, [1865])
Symmachia multesima Stichel, 1910
Symmachia miron Grose-Smith, 1898
Symmachia norina Hewitson, 1867
Symmachia pardalis Hewitson, 1867
Symmachia poirieri, Gallard, 2009
Symmachia probetor (Stoll, [1782])
Symmachia rosanti Gallard, 2008
Symmachia stigmosissima Stichel, 1910
Symmachia technema Stichel, 1910
Symmachia threissa Hewitson, 1870
Symmachia triangularis (Thieme, 1907)
Symmachia tricolor Hewitson, 1867
Symmachia tigrina Hewitson, 1867
Symmachia virgatula Stichel, 1910
Synargis abaris (Cramer, 1776)
Synargis agle (Hewitson, [1853])
Synargis calyce (C. & R. Felder, 1862)
Synargis chaonia (Hewitson, [1853])
Synargis fenestrella (Lathy, 1932)
Synargis galena (Bates, 1868)
Synargis orestessa Hübner, [1819]
Synargis phliasus (Clerck, 1764)
Synargis tytia (Cramer, [1777])
Themone pais (Hübner, [1820])
Theope amicitiae Hall, Gallard & Brévignon, 1998
Theope archimedes (Fabricius, 1793)
Theope aureonitens Bates, 1868
Theope barea Godman & Salvin, 1878
Theope batesi Hall, 1998
Theope brevignoni Gallard, 1996
Theope caroli Brevignon, 2011
Theope christiani Hall & Willmott, 1999
Theope christophi rorota Brevignon, 2011
Theope discus Bates, 1868
Theope ebera Brevignon, 2011
Theope ernestinae Brevignon, 2011
Theope eudocia Westwood, 1851
Theope eurygonina Bates, 1868
Theope excelsa Bates, 1868
Theope fayneli Gallard, 2002
Theope fernandezi Brevignon, 2011
Theope foliolum Brevignon, 2011
Theope foliorum Bates, 1868
Theope fracisi Brevignon, 2010
Theope galionicus Gallard & Brévignon, 1989
Theope guillaumei Gallard, 1996
Theope janus Bates, 1867
Theope johannispetreus Brevignon, 2010
Theope lampropteryx Bates, 1868
Theope leucanthe Bates, 1868
Theope lichyi Brevignon, 2011
Theope lycaenina Bates, 1868
Theope martinae Brevignon, 2011
Theope minialba Gallard, 2006
Theope mundula Stichel, 1926
Theope nobilis Bates, 1868
Theope nycteis (Westwood, 1851)
Theope orphana (Stichel, 1911)
Theope palambala Gallard, 2009
Theope pedias Herrich-Schäffer, [1853]
Theope phaeo Prittwiz, 1865
Theope philotes (Westwood, 1851)
Theope pieridoides C. & R. Felder, 1865
Theope rochambellus Brevignon, 2010
Theope saphir Brevignon, 2009
Theope sericea Bates, 1868
Theope sobrina Bates, 1868
Theope sticheli Hall, 1998
Theope terambus (Godart, [1824])
Theope tetrastigmoides Hall, 2008
Theope thootes Hewitson, 1860
Theope virgilius (Fabricius, 1793)
Theope wallacei Hall, 1998
Theope zafaran Brevignon, 2011
Thisbe molela (Hewitson, 1865)
Xenandra helius (Cramer, 1779)
Xynias lithosina (Bates, 1868)
Zelotaea alba Gallard & Brévignon, 1989
Zelotaea suffusca Brévignon & Gallard, 1993

Pieridae

Coliadinae 

Anteos menippe (Hübner, [1818])
Aphrissa fluminensis (d'Almeida, 1921)
Eurema agave (Cramer, 1775)
Eurema daira (Godart, 1819)
Eurema elathea (Cramer, [1777])
Eurema mexicana (Boisduval, 1836)
Eurema venusta (Boisduval, 1836)
Phoebis neocypris (Hübner, [1823])
Phoebis philea (Linnaeus, 1763)
 Phoebis sennae (Linnaeus, 1758)

Dismorphiinae 

Dismorphia amphione (Cramer, [1779])
Dismorphia crisia (Drury, [1782])
Dismorphia theucharila (Doubleday, 1848)
Dismorphia zathoe (Hewitson, [1858])
Enantia aloikea Brévignon, 1993
Moschoneura pinthous (Linnaeus, 1758)
Patia orise (Boisduval, [1836])

Pierinae 

Appias drusilla (Cramer, [1777])
Archonias brassolis (Fabricius, 1777)
Ascia monuste (Linnaeus, 1764)
Hesperocharis nera (Hewitson, 1852)
Itaballia demophile (Linnaeus, 1758)
Perrhybris pamela (Stoll, [1780])

Lycaenidae

Polyommatinae 
Leptotes cassius (Cramer, [1775])
Leptotes marina (Reakirt, 1868)

Theclinae

Arawacus aetolus Sultzer, 1776
Arcas imperialis (Cramer, [1775])
Atlides inachus (Cramer, [1775])
Arumecla aruma (Hewitson, 1877)
Bistonina erema (Hewitson, 1867)
Brangas getus (Fabricius, 1787)
Calycopis cerata (Hewitson, 1877)
Calycopis caesaries (Druce, 1907)
Calycopis calus (Godart, [1824])
Calycopis matho (Godman & Salvin, [1887])
Calycopis puppius (Godman & Salvin, [1887])
Calycopis xeneta (Hewitson, 1877)
Celmia anastomosis (Draudt, [1918])
Celmia color (Druce, 1907)
Chlorostrymon simaethis (Drury, [1773])
Contrafacia imma (Prittwitz, 1865)
Enos falerina (Hewitson, 1867)
Erora badeta (Hewitson, 1873)
Evenus batesi (Hewitson, 1865)
Evenus floralia (Druce, 1907)
Evenus gabriela (Cramer, 1775)
Evenus sponsa (Möschler, 1877)
Exorbaetta metanira (Hewitson, 1867)
Iaspis thabena (Hewitson, 1868)
Janthecla leea Venables & Robbins, 1991
Janthecla malvina (Hewitson, 1867)
Janthecla sista (Hewitson, 1867)
Kolana ergina (Hewitson, 1867)
Kolana ligurina (Hewitson, 1874)
Lamprospilus badaca (Hewitson, 1868)
Lamprospilus quadramacula (Austin & Johnson, 1997)
Laothus numen (Druce, 1907)
Lathecla latagus (Godman & Salvin, [1887])
Ministrymon coronta (Hewitson, 1874)
Nicolaea besidia (Hewitson, 1868)
Nicolaea fabulla (Hewitson, 1868)
Oenomaus isabellae Faynel, 2006
Ostrinotes purpuriticus (Druce, 1907)
Ostrinotes tarena (Hewitson, 1874)
Paiwarria telemus (Cramer, [1775])
Panthiades aeolus (Fabricius, 1775)
Parrhasius m-album (Boisduval & Le Conte, 1833)
Parrhasius orgia (Hewitson, 1867)
Porthecla forasteira Faynel & Moser, 2011
Porthecla minyia (Hewitson, 1867)
Strephonota acameda (Hewitson, 1867)
Strephonota adela (Staudinger, 1888)
Strephonota ambrax (Westwood, 1852)
Strephonota bicolorata Faynel, 2003
Strephonota carteia (Hewitson, 1867)
Strephonota cyllarissus (Herbst, 1800)
Strephonota malvania (Hewitson, 1867)
Strephonota parvipuncta (Lathy, 1926)
Strephonota porphyritis (Druce, 1907)
Strephonota sphinx (Fabricius, 1775)
Strephonota strephon (Fabricius, 1775)
Strephonota syedra (Hewitson, 1867)
Strephonota tephraeus (Geyer, 1837)
Strephonota tyriam (Druce, 1907)
Strymon megarus (Godart, [1824])
Symbiopsis nivepunctata (Druce, 1907)
Theclopsis lydus (Hübner, [1819])
Thepytus thyrea (Hewitson, 1867)
Thereus cithonius (Godart, [1824])
Thereus pedusa (Hewitson, 1867)
Thereus tiasa (Hewitson, 1869)
Theritas hemon (Cramer, [1775])
Theritas triquetra (Hewitson, 1865)
Theritas viresco (Druce, 1907)
Thestius pholeus (Cramer, [1777])
Tmolus venustus (Druce, 1907)
Trichonis hyacinthus (Cramer, [1775])
Trichonis immaculata Lathy, 1930

Nymphalidae

Apaturinae 
Doxocopa agathina (Cramer, [1777])

Biblidinae 

Antigonis pharsalia (Hewitson, [1852])
Asterope markii (Hewitson, 1857)
Callicore astarte (Cramer, 1779)
Callicore maronensis (Oberthür, 1916)
Callicore pygas (Godart, [1824])
Callicore texa (Hewitson, [1855])
Catonephele acontius (Linnaeus, 1771)
Catonephele antinoe (Godart, [1824])
Catonephele numilia (Cramer, 1776)
Diaethria clymena (Cramer, [1775])
Dynamine athemon (Linnaeus, 1758)
Dynamine laugieri (Oberthür, 1916)
Dynamine pebana Staudinger, [1885]
Eunica alpais (Godart, [1824])
Eunica amelia (Cramer, 1777)
Eunica anna (Cramer, 1780)
Eunica eurota (Cramer, [1775])
Eunica orphise (Cramer, [1775])
Eunica sophonisba (Cramer, 1780)
Eunica volumna Godart, 1824
Hamadryas amphinome (Linnaeus, 1767)
Hamadryas arinome (Lucas, 1853)
Hamadryas feronia (Linnaeus, 1758)
Mestra dorcas (Fabricius, 1775)
Myscelia milloi Oberthür, 1916
Nessaea batesii (C. & R. Felder, 1860)
Panacea bleuzeni Plantrou & Attal, 1986
Paulogramma pyracmon (Godart, [1824])
Pyrrhogyra amphiro Bates, 1865
 Pyrrhogyra edocla (Doubleday, 1848)
Pyrrhogyra neaerea (Linnaeus, 1758)
Pyrrhogyra otolais Bates, 1864
Pyrrhogyra stratonicus Fruhstorfer, 1908
Temenis laothoe (Cramer, [1777])
Vila emilia (Cramer, [1779])

Charaxinae 

 Agrias amydon Hewitson, 1854
Agrias claudina (Godart, [1824])
Agrias narcissus Staudinger, [1885]
 Archaeoprepona amphimachus (Fabricius, 1775)
Archaeoprepona demophon (Linnaeus, 1758)
Fountainea ryphea (Cramer, [1775])
Hypna clytemnestra (Cramer, 1777)
Memphis acidalia (Hübner, [1819])
Memphis basilia (Stoll, [1780])
Memphis glauce (C. & R. Felder, 1862)
Memphis grandis (Druce, 1877)
Memphis laertes (Cramer, [1775])
Memphis leonida (Stoll, [1782])
Memphis moruus (Fabricius, 1775)
Memphis oenomais (Boisduval, 1870)
Memphis phantes (Hopffer, 1874)
Memphis philumena (Doubleday, [1849])
Memphis pithyusa (R. Felder, 1869)
Memphis polycarmes (Fabricius, 1775)
Memphis xenocles (Westwood, 1850)
Polygrapha xenocrates (Westwood, 1850)
Prepona dexamenus Hopffer, 1874
Prepona eugenes Bates, 1865
Prepona gnorima Bates, 1865
Prepona laertes (Hübner, [1811])
Prepona lygia Fruhstorfer, 1904
Prepona neoterpe Honrath, 1844
Prepona pheridamas (Cramer, [1777])
Prepona philipponi Le Moult, 1932
Prepona pseudomphale Le Moult, 1932
Prepona pylene Hewitson, 1853
Prepona werneri Hering, 1925
Zaretis itys (Cramer, 1777)

Cyrestinae
Marpesia orsilochus (Fabricius, 1776)

Danainae 

Aeria eurimedia (Cramer, [1777])
Callithomia alexirrhoe Bates, 1862
Callithomia lenea (Cramer, [1779])
Ceratinia cayana (Salvin, 1869)
Ceratinia neso (Hübner, [1806])
Danaus eresimus (Cramer, [1777])
Danaus gilippus (Cramer, [1775])
Danaus plexippus (Linnaeus, 1758)
Dircenna adina (Hewitson, [1855])
Dircenna dero (Hübner, 1823)
Episcada clausina (Hewitson, 1876)
Forbestra equicola (Cramer, [1780])
Godyris zavaleta (Hewitson, [1854])
Hypoleria lavinia (Hewitson, [1855])
Hyposcada anchiala (Hewitson, 1868)
Hyposcada illinissa (Hewitson, 1851)
Hyposcada zarepha (Hewitson, 1869)
Hypothyris euclea (Godart, 1819)
Hypothyris fluonia (Hewitson, 1854)
Hypothyris gemella Fox, 1971
Hypothyris leprieuri (Feisthamel, 1835)
Hypothyris ninonia (Hübner, [1806])
Hypothyris vallonia (Hewitson, [1853])
Hypothyris xanthostola (Bates, 1862)
Lycorea pasinuntia (Stoll, [1780])
Lycorea halia (Hübner, 1816)
Mcclungia cymo (Hübner, [1806])
Mechanitis lysimnia (Fabricius, 1793)
Mechanitis mazaeus Hewitson, 1860
Mechanitis polymnia (Linnaeus, 1758)
Melinaea lilis (Doubleday, 1847)
Melinaea ludovica (Cramer, [1780])
Melinaea menophilus (Hewitson, [1856])
Melinaea mnasias (Hewitson, [1856])
Melinaea mneme (Linnaeus, 1763)
Melinaea satevis (Doubleday, 1847)
Methona grandior (Forbes, 1944)
Methona megisto C. & R. Felder, 1860
Napeogenes inachia (Hewitson, 1855)
Napeogenes rhezia (Geyer, [1834])
Napeogenes sylphis (Guérin-Méneville, [1844])
Oleria antaxis (Haensch, 1909)
Oleria astrea (Cramer, [1775])
Oleria flora (Cramer, 1779)
Oleria ilerdina (Hewitson, [1858])
Pseudoscada florula (Hewitson, [1855])
Pteronymia primula (Bates, 1862)
Scada reckia (Hübner, [1808])
Sais rosalia (Cramer, [1779])
Thyridia psidii (Linnaeus, 1758)
Tithorea harmonia (Cramer, [1777])

Heliconiinae 

Actinote thalia (Linnaeus, 1758)
Agraulis vanillae (Boisduval & Le Conte, 1835)
Dione juno (Cramer, [1779])
Eueides aliphera Godart, 1819
Eueides isabella Cramer, 1781
Eueides lampeto Bates, 1862
Eueides libitina Staudinger, 1885
Eueides lybia Fabricius, 1775
Eueides tales (Cramer, [1775])
Eueides vibilia Godart, 1819
 Heliconius antiochus (Linnaeus, 1767)
Heliconius aoede (Hübner, [1813])
Heliconius burneyi (Hübner, [1831])
Heliconius charithonia (Linnaeus, 1767)
Heliconius demeter Staudinger, [1897]
Heliconius doris (Linnaeus, 1771)
Heliconius egeria (Cramer, 1775)
Heliconius elevatus Nöldner, 1901
Heliconius erato (Linnaeus, 1764)
Heliconius ethilla Godart, 1819
Heliconius hecale (Fabricius, 1775)
Heliconius lalitae Brévignon, 1996
Heliconius melpomene (Linnaeus, 1758)
Heliconius metharme (Erichson, [1849])
Heliconius numata (Cramer, [1780])
 Heliconius ricini (Linnaeus, 1758)
Heliconius telesiphe Doubleday, 1874
Heliconius wallacei Reakirt, 1866
Heliconius xanthocles Bates, 1862
 Philaethria andrei Brevignon, 2002
 Philaethria pygmalion (Fruhstorfer, 1912)

Libytheinae 
Libytheana carinenta (Cramer, [1777])

Limenitidinae 

Adelpha boreas (Butler, [1866])
Adelpha cocala (Cramer, [1779])
Adelpha cytherea (Linnaeus, 1758)
Adelpha erotia (Hewitson, 1847)
Adelpha ethelda (Hewitson, 1867)
Adelpha iphiclus (Linnaeus, 1758)
Adelpha melona (Hewitson, 1847)
Adelpha nea (Hewitson, 1847)
Adelpha plesaure Hübner, 1823
Adelpha pollina Fruhstorfer, 1915
Adelpha radiata Fruhstorfer, 1915
Adelpha serpa (Boisduval, [1836])
Adelpha thesprotia (C. & R. Felder, [1867])

Morphinae 

Antirrhea ornata (Butler, 1870)
Antirrhea philoctetes (Linnaeus, 1758)
Caerois chorinaeus (Fabricius, 1775)
Caligo euphorbus (C. Felder & R. Felder, 1862)
Caligo eurilochus (Cramer, [1775])
Caligo idomeneus (Linnaeus, 1758)
Caligo teucer (Linnaeus, 1758)
Catoblepia berecynthia (Cramer, [1777])
Catoblepia versitincta (Stichel, 1901)
Catoblepia xanthicles (Godman & Salvin, [1881])
Catoblepia xanthus (Linnaeus, 1758)
Dynastor darius (Fabricius, 1775)
Dynastor macrosiris (Westwood, 1851)
Morpho achilles (Linnaeus, 1758)
Morpho adonis (Cramer, 1775), synonym of Morpho marcus
Morpho deidamia (Hübner, [1819])
Morpho eugenia Deyrolle, 1860
Morpho hecuba (Linnaeus, 1771)
Morpho helenor (Cramer, 1776)
Morpho marcus (Schaller, 1785)
Morpho menelaus (Linnaeus, 1758)
Morpho rhetenor (Cramer, [1775])
Morpho telemachus (Linnaeus, 1758)
Opsiphanes cassiae (Linnaeus, 1758)
Opsiphanes cassina C. & R. Felder, 1862
Opsiphanes invirae (Hübner, [1808])
Selenophanes cassiope (Cramer, [1775])

Nymphalinae 

Anartia amathea (Linnaeus, 1758)
Anartia jatrophae (Linnaeus, 1763)
Baeotus aeilus (Stoll, 1780)
Colobura annulata Willmott, Constantino & Hall, 2001
Colobura dirce (Linnaeus, 1758)
Eresia clio (Linnaeus, 1758)
Eresia erysice (Geyer, 1832)
Eresia eunice (Hübner, [1807])
Eresia nauplius (Linnaeus, 1758)
Eresia perna Hewitson, [1852]
Historis acheronta (Fabricius, 1775)
Hypolimnas misippus (Linnaeus, 1764)
Janatella hera (Cramer, [1779])
Junonia evarete (Cramer, [1779])
Junonia genoveva (Cramer, [1780])
Ortilia liriope (Cramer, [1775])
Siproeta stelenes (Linnaeus, 1758)
Tegosa claudina (Eschscholtz, 1821)
Telenassa fontus (Hall, 1928)

Satyrinae 

Amiga arnaca (Fabricius, 1776)
Amphidecta calliomma (C. Felder & R. Felder, 1862)
Caeruleuptychia brixius (Godart, [1824])
Caeruleuptychia caerulea (Butler, 1869)
Caeruleuptychia helios (Weymer, 1911)
Caeruleuptychia penicillata (Godman, 1905)
Caeruleuptychia twalela Brévignon, 2005
Cepheuptychia cephus (Fabricius, 1775)
Chloreuptychia chlorimene (Hübner, [1819])
Chloreuptychia herseis (Godart, [1824])
Chloreuptychia hewitsonii (Butler, 1867)
Chloreuptychia tolumnia (Cramer, 1777)
Cissia lesbia (Staudinger, [1886])
Cissia maripa Brévignon, 2005
Cissia myncea (Cramer, 1780)
Cissia penelope (Fabricius, 1775)
Cissia terrestris (Butler, 1867)
Cithaerias andromeda (Fabricius, 1775)
Erichthodes antonina (C. & R. Felder, [1867])
Euptychia marceli Brévignon, 2005
Euptychia mollina suzannae Brévignon, 2005
Euptychia neildi Brévignon, 2005
Euptychia rufocincta Weymer, 1911
Euptychia westwoodi muli Brévignon, 2005
Haetera piera (Linnaeus, 1758)
Harjesia blanda (Möschler, 1877)
Harjesia griseola (Weyner, 1910)
Harjesia gulnare (Butler, 1870) syn Harjesia oreba
Hermeuptychia hermes (Fabricius, 1775)
Magneuptychia divergens (Butler, 1867)
Magneuptychia gera (Hewitson, 1850)
Magneuptychia harpyia (C. & R. Felder, 1867)
Magneuptychia iris (C. & R. Felder, 1867)
Magneuptychia lea (Cramer, [1780])
Magneuptychia libye (Linnaeus, 1767)
Magneuptychia modesta (Butler, 1867)
Magneuptychia murrayae Brévignon, 2005
Magneuptychia newtoni (A.Hall, 1939)
Magneuptychia ocypete (Fabricius, 1776)
Magneuptychia tricolor (Hewitson, 1850)
Magneuptychia sp.
Manataria hercyna (Hübner, [1821])
Megeuptychia antonoe (Cramer, 1775)
Pareuptychia binocula (Butler, 1869)
Pareuptychia hervei Brévignon, 2005
Pareuptychia hesionides deviae Brévignon, 2005
Pareuptychia lydia (Cramer, 1777)
Pareuptychia ocirrhoe (Fabricius, 1775)
Paryphthimoides argulus (Godart, [1824])
Paryphthimoides undulata (Butler, 1867)
Pierella astyoche (Erichson, [1849])
Pierella lamia (Sulzer, 1776)
Pierella hyalinus (Gmelin, [1790])
Pierella lena (Linnaeus, 1767)
Posttaygetis penelea (Cramer, 1775)
Pseudodebis marpessa (Hewintson, 1862)
Pseudodebis valentina (Cramer, 1779)
Splendeuptychia clorimena (Stoll, 1780)
Splendeuptychia furina (Hewintson, 1862)
Splendeuptychia itonis (Hewintson, 1862)
Splendeuptychia purusana ( Aurivillius, 1929)
Taygetis cleopatra C. Felder and R. Felder, 1862
Taygetis echo (Cramer, 1775)
Taygetis laches (Fabricius, 1793)
Taygetis mermeria Cramer, 1776
Taygetis oyapock Brévignon, 2007
Taygetis rufomarginata Staudinger, 1888
Taygetis thamyra (Cramer, 1779)
Taygetis virgilia (Cramer, 1776)
Taygetis zippora (Butler, 1869)
Taygetomorpha celia (Cramer, 1779)
Yphthimoides renata (Stoll, 1780)
Yphthimoides eriphule (Butler, 1867)

Hesperiidae

Hesperiinae 

Anatrytone barbara (Williams & Bell, 1931)
Anatrytone sarah Burns, 1994
Arotis bryna (Evans, 1955)
Arotis evansi (Mielke, 1972)
Artines aepitus (Geyer, [1832])
Atalopedes campestris (Boisduval, 1852)
Carystoides yenna Evans, 1955
Carystus hocus Evans, 1955
Copaeodes jean Evans, 1955
Corticea lysias (Plötz, 1883)
Cymaenes alumna (Butler, 1877)
Cynea anthracinus (Mabille, 1877)
Cynea cyrus (Plötz, 1882)
Cynea diluta (Herrich-Schäffer, 1869)
Cynea robba Evans, 1955
Enosis iccius Evans, 1955
Eutychide subpunctata Hayward, 1940
Lerema ancillaris (Butler, 1877)
Mnasilus allubita (Butler, 1877)
Nastra guianae (Lindsey, 1925)
Orphe vatinius Godman, [1901]
Orthos trinka Evans, 1955
Papias ignarus (Bell, 1932)
Papias phaeomelas (Hübner, [1831])
Papias phainis Godman, [1900]
Paracarystys hypargyra (Herrich-Schäffer, 1869)
Penicula advena (Draudt, 1923)
Perichares butus (Möschler, 1877)
Phanes almoda (Hewitson, 1866)
Phemiades pohli (Bell, 1932)
Phlebodes campo (Bell, 1947)
Polites vibex (Geyer, [1832])
Propertius phineus (Cramer, [1777])
Quasimellana angra (Evans, 1955)
Quasimellana eulogius (Plötz, 1883)
Quasimellana pandora (Hayward, 1940)
Saliana severus (Mabille, 1895)
Saliana vixen Evans, 1955
Saturnus reticulata (Plötz, 1883)
Saturnus saturnus (Fabricius, 1787)
Thargella caura (Plötz, 1882)
Vettius marcus (Fabricius, 1787)
Vettius phyllus (Cramer, [1777])
Wallengrenia otho (Smith, 1797)

Pyrginae 

Aguna coelus (Stoll, [1781])
Astraptes apastus (Cramer, [1777])
Augiades crinisus (Cramer, [1780])
Augiades epimethea (Plötz, 1883)
Autochton bipunctatus (Gmelin, [1790])
Autochton itylus Hübner, [1823]
Autochton neis (Geyer, 1832)
Bungalotis borax Evans, 1952
Bungalotis midas (Cramer, [1775])
Cabirus procas (Cramer, [1777])
Camptopleura termon (Hopffer, 1874)
Carrhenes fuscescens (Mabille, 1891)
Celaenorrhinus shema (Hewitson, 1877)
Charidia lucaria (Hewitson, 1868)
Chiomara basigutta (Plötz, 1884)
Chiomara mithrax (Möschler, 1879)
Clito clito (Fabricius, 1787)
Clito littera (Mabille, 1877)
Drephalys olvina Evans, 1952
Drephalys oriander (Hewitson, 1867)
Drephalys talboti (Le Cerf, 1922)
Dyscophellus euribates (Stoll, [1782])
Dyscophellus sebaldus (Stoll, [1781])
Ebrietas evanidus Mabille, 1898
Ectomis cythna (Hewitson, 1878)
Entheus gentius (Cramer, 1777)
Entheus priassus (Linnaeus, 1758)
Eracon clinias (Mabille, 1878)
Heliopetes arsalte (Linnaeus, 1758)
Heliopyrgus domicella (Erichson, 1848)
Hyalothyrus infernalis (Möschler, 1877)
Iliana heros (Mabille & Boullet, 1917)
Milanion hemes (Cramer, [1777])
Milanion leucaspis (Mabille, 1878)
Morvina falisca (Hewitson, 1878)
Narcosius aulina (Evans, 1952)
Nascus broteas (Cramer, 1780)
Nascus paulliniae (Sepp, [1842])
Nisoniades brunneata (Williams & Bell, 1939)
Nisoniades ephora (Herrich-Schäffer, 1870)
Nisoniades guianae (Williams & Bell, 1939)
Nisoniades laurentina (Williams & Bell, 1939)
Nisoniades macarius (Herrich-Schäffer, 1870)
Nisoniades mimas (Cramer, [1775])
Nisoniades rubescens (Möschler, 1877)
Oileides azines (Hewitson, 1867)
Oileides fenestratus (Gmelin, [1790])
Oileides vulpinus Hübner, [1825]
Onenses kelso Evans, 1953
Ouleus juxta (Bell, 1934)
Pachyneuria lista Evans, 1953
Paramimus scurra (Hübner, [1809])
Phanus vitreus (Stoll, [1781])
Phocides polybius (Fabricius, 1793)
Phocides thermus (Mabille, 1883)
Plumbago pulverea (Mabille, 1878)
Polygonus savigny (Latreille, [1824])
Polythrix auginus (Hewitson, 1867)
Porphyrogenes sororcula (Mabille & Boullet, 1912)
Proteides mercurius (Fabricius, 1787)
Pseudodrephalys hypargus (Mabille, 1891)
Pyrdalus corbulo (Stoll, [1781])
Pythonides lerina (Hewitson, 1868)
Pythonides limaea (Hewitson, 1868)
Quadrus contubernalis (Mabille, 1883)
Quadrus deyrollei (Mabille, 1887)
Sostrata festiva (Erichson, [1849])
Staphylus incisus (Mabille, 1878)
Tarsoctenus praecia (Hewitson, [1857])
Telemiades epicalus Hübner, [1819]
Telemiades nicomedes (Möschler, 1879)
Urbanus albimargo (Mabille, 1875)
Urbanus procne (Plötz, 1880)
Urbanus simplicius (Stoll, [1790])
Urbanus teleus (Hübner, 1821)
Urbanus velinus (Plötz, 1880)
Urbanus virescens (Mabille, 1877)
Xenophanes tryxus (Stoll, [1780])

Pyrrhopyginae 

Aspitha aspitha (Hewitson, [1866])
Croniades pieria (Hewitson, [1857])
Jemadia fallax (Mabille, 1878)
Jemadia gnetus (Fabricius, 1781)
Jemadia hewitsonii (Mabille, 1878)
Mysarbia sejanus Hopffer, 1874
Myscelus assaricus (Cramer, [1779])
Myscelus pegasus Mabille, 1903
Myscelus santhilarius (Latreille, [1824])
Mysoria barcastus (Sepp, [1851])
Parelbella ahira (Hewitson, [1866])
Parelbella polyzona (Latreille, [1824])
Passova glacia Evans, 1951
Passova passova (Hewitson, [1866])
Protelbella alburna (Mabille, 1891)
Pyrrhopyge amyclas (Cramer, 1779)
Pyrrhopyge amythaon Bell, 1931
Pyrrhopyge arinas (Cramer, 1777)
Pyrrhopyge creusae (Bell, 1931)
Pyrrhopyge evansi Bell, 1947 or Pyrrhopyge phidias evansi
Pyrrhopyge phidias (Linnaeus, 1758)
Pyrrhopyge proculus Hopffer, 1874
Pyrrhopyge sergius Hopffer, 1874
Pyrrhopyge thericles Mabille, 1891
Yanguna thelersa (Hewitson, 1866)

Day-flying moths 
Urania leilus (Linnaeus, 1758)

Sources 
 Lépidoptères de Guyane, Lépidoptéristes de France, tomes III et IV,  and

References

See also
List of butterflies of the Amazon River basin and the Andes

Butterflies

French Guiana
Guiana